Marnie McGuire (born 22 February 1969) is a former New Zealand professional golfer who played mostly on the LPGA of Japan Tour.

McGuire won the British Ladies Amateur in 1986 as a 17-year-old and was at the time the youngest champion in the tournament's history. She was also the individual winner of the 1991 Queen Sirikit Cup. She played college golf at Oklahoma State where she was an All-American in 1990. While at Oklahoma State, she was diagnosed with malignant melanoma which led her to compete wearing long-sleeved shirts, a big floppy hat, and long slacks.

McGuire won five times as a professional on the Japan Tour and was awarded the Sportswoman of the Year title at the 1996 Halberg Awards. She is the only New Zealander to have won the Women's Australian Open, and the British Ladies Amateur. She also played on the LPGA Tour from 1999 to 2003.

Amateur wins
1986 British Ladies Amateur
1991 Queen Sirikit Cup (individual title)

Professional wins (6)

LPGA of Japan Tour wins (5)
1994 Nasu Ogawa Ladies
1995 Goyo Kenetsu Open, Daikin Orchid Ladies
1996 Mitsukoshi Cup
1998 Suntory Ladies Open

ALPG Tour wins (1)
1998 AAMI Women's Australian Open1

Ladies European Tour wins (1)
1998 AAMI Women's Australian Open1

1 Co-sanctioned by ALPG Tour and Ladies European Tour

Team appearances
Amateur
Espirito Santo Trophy (representing New Zealand): 1986
Commonwealth Trophy (representing New Zealand): 1991
Queen Sirikit Cup (representing New Zealand): 1986, 1991 (individual winner)

References

New Zealand female golfers
Oklahoma State Cowgirls golfers
LPGA of Japan Tour golfers
LPGA Tour golfers
ALPG Tour golfers
Winners of ladies' major amateur golf championships
1969 births
Living people